Jarvis Williams may refer to:

Jarvis Williams (basketball) (born 1993), American basketball player
 Jarvis Williams (entrepreneur), part owner of Hinkley, Williams and Company in the late 19th century, see Hinkley Locomotive Works
 Jarvis Williams (defensive back) (born 1965), American football player
 Jarvis Williams (wide receiver) (born 1987), American football player